Alexandria Monroe High School is a high school in Alexandria, Indiana, United States.

About
Alexandria Monroe High School is a co-educational public school enrolling students in grades 9–12.  It is under the auspices of the Alexandria Community School Corporation.  The school enrolls around 800 students.

Athletics 
The Alexandria-Monroe Tigers Compete on the Central Indiana Athletic Conference. The Tigers won the IHSAA AA championship in baseball in 1998 as well as 2019. They also won the IHSAA AA Championship for boys basketball in 1998.

Notable alumni
 J.D. Closser - former MLB catcher for the Colorado Rockies
 Joey Martin Feek - former country music artist; married to singer/songwriter Rory Feek; starred in Can You Duet on CMT

See also
 List of high schools in Indiana

References

External links
School website

Schools in Madison County, Indiana
Public high schools in Indiana